The Seattle Monorail Project was a proposed five-line monorail system to be constructed in Seattle, Washington, US, as an extension of the existing Seattle Center Monorail.  The , 17 station Green Line running from Ballard to West Seattle via Seattle Center would have been the first of the five lines to be built.

From 1997 to 2005 the monorail project was a highly contentious political issue in the Seattle area.  In November 2005, following the fifth voter initiative on the monorail in eight years, the monorail authority agreed to dissolve itself after having spent $124.7 million in taxpayer funds without beginning any monorail construction.

History

Initiative 41 and ETC
The effort to extend the monorail began in 1997 with Initiative 41, passed by a 53%–47% vote by Seattle citizens.  The initiative proposed a  X-shaped monorail system extending the  line constructed for the 1962 Seattle World's Fair.   The system's construction and operation was to be carried out by a new agency, the Elevated Transportation Corporation (ETC), using private funding.

The ETC quickly determined that private entrepreneurs could not build a monorail system without public financial support, leading to a second monorail referendum placed before voters as Initiative 53 in 2000, which would allow the ETC to spend $6 million for additional studies to determine an improved monorail plan with full cost estimates and a funding package to pay for construction. I-53 passed 56% to 44% in 2000.

Five-line plan

By 2002, the ETC had developed the five-line system plan that came to be called the Seattle Monorail Project.  This proposal was put before the voters as Citizens Petition #1 in November 2002 which would propose to dissolve the ETC, create a new monorail agency, construct the Green Line as the first part of the system, and enact an annual 1.4% motor-vehicle excise tax (MVET) on Seattle vehicles to fund the project.

The 2002 petition drew opposition from groups who advanced the following arguments:
 Green Line ridership would not be significantly different from that already achieved by Metro buses
 The monorail line should be built along the I-5 freeway corridor, among other complaints.

Reflecting the increased opposition, Citizens Petition #1 narrowly passed in November 2002 by just 877 votes, 50.2% to 49.7%.  With the passage of CP-1, construction was scheduled to begin in autumn 2005, and be completed in 2009.

Just two years later in November 2004, a recall initiative, I-83, was put on the ballot seeking to halt the project by forcing the city to deny the monorail agency the right to use the air space above public city streets.  This fourth initiative in seven years proved unpopular with Seattle voters however, and lost 64% to 36%.

Financial issues
The tax to fund the project began effective June 2003, and was levied annually on each car registered in the city based on the MSRP of the vehicle and a fixed depreciation table. In 2005, the average monorail tax per vehicle was $130 annually.

The project soon fell under intense public scrutiny, as actual revenue from the motor vehicle excise tax came in 30% under projections while projected costs rose by 10%.  To bridge the shortfall, the SMP initially proposed extending the tax and bond repayments over a 50-year time horizon, resulting in nearly $9 billion in interest paid on the $2 billion construction cost. The plan to extend the tax proved highly controversial and five days later the SMP withdrew its financial plan and the director and board chairman resigned under pressure.

Loss of city support and closure
Seattle Mayor Greg Nickels gave the board an ultimatum to create a new financial plan or lose city support for the project. A new plan was not developed, and on September 16, 2005, Nickels withdrew city support for the project.
While the city of Seattle could not officially stop the project, it could withhold permission to build on or above city land, as had been proposed under I-83 a year earlier. Nickels also called on the Seattle Monorail Project to put a measure on the November 2005 ballot to determine whether or not to continue with the project, marking the fifth time Seattleites would vote on the issue.

Proposition 1 was defeated, 65% to 35%, and in response the SMP reduced staff, terminated the annual motor vehicle excise tax on Seattle vehicles effective June 30, 2006 (three years after it was first implemented) and began liquidating properties already purchased for the Green Line.

The Seattle Monorail Authority was formally dissolved on January 17, 2008, after liquidating all of its assets, repaying its debts, and transferring its remaining $425,963.07 to the King County Metro system.  The monorail project ultimately cost Seattle taxpayers $124.7 million.

Design
The plan, as proposed by CP-1 (2002) proposed five distinct corridors based on the Intermediate Capacity Transit Study and prioritized the Green Line, a north–south route on the west side of the city, as the first of the five to be built. The other four lines included two additional north–south routes, in the center (Blue) and east (Gold) sides of the city, and two east-west connectors, one just north of the Lake Washington Ship Canal (Purple) and the other near the southern city limits (Red). Two future extensions were proposed to the Green Line, one each on the north and south ends.

By 2004, more formal Second Phase plans were developed; the Blue line was cut back and did not cross the Duwamish, but the Red line was extended west to meet a new branch of the Blue line running south from Delridge. In addition, an alternative central north–south Rainbow corridor was added, running from downtown to the University District and continuing on to Northgate and Lake City, approximately following the route of I-5.

Green Line
The proposed Green Line ran mostly north-south from Ballard through Magnolia, Queen Anne, Seattle Center, Downtown, Pioneer Square, Chinatown-International District, then turned west and terminated into West Seattle.

Planned expansion

Future extensions on the Green Line could have taken it east (from the north terminus at Crown Hill) to Northgate and south (from the south terminus at Morgan Junction) to the Vashon Island Ferry Terminal.

Additional planned lines included:
 Gold: north–south, connecting Lake City, UW, Capitol Hill, Chinatown-International District, and Downtown. Multiple alignments and phases were studied.
 Alternative 1: 2nd & Madison to Montlake, 
 Alternative 2: Chinatown–ID to Broadway & Roy, 
 Alternative 3: Chinatown–ID to 23rd & Madison, 
 Alternative 3A: Chinatown–ID to U-Village, 
 Alternative 4: Chinatown–ID to Rainier, 
 Alternative 5: Rainier Valley Center to Lake City, 
 Alternative 5A: Rainier Valley Center to U-Village, 
 Purple: east–west, connecting Shilshole and Magnuson Park
 Purple Segment 1: Ballard to Children's Hospital, 
 Purple Segment 2: Children's Hospital to Sandpoint, 
 Blue: north–south, connecting Greenwood, Fremont, Downtown, SODO, South Park, and Georgetown
 Blue North: Bitter Lake to downtown via Aurora
 Blue South (4th): South Park to downtown
 Blue South (Delridge): Westwood/Highland Park to Delridge (Green Line station)
 Red: east–west, connecting South Park and the Rainier Valley (outside Seattle city limits; preliminary work only)
 Rainbow: north–south, connecting downtown to the University District, with two potential extensions continuing on toward the north:
 Extension 1: U-District to Northgate
 Extension 2: U-District to Lake City

See also
 Seattle Streetcar – a project whose first line was built during the time when the monorail would have been built
 Link light rail – a light rapid transit project executed by Sound Transit in the Seattle area.  The first line in Seattle, Central Link, began service in 2009, with expansion to the University of Washington completed in 2016.

References

External links
Website commemorating the defunct Seattle monorail project.
 

Transportation in Seattle
Cancelled monorails
Proposed transportation infrastructure in the United States
Cancelled projects in the United States